Why Cats Paint is a comedy book written by New Zealand author Burton Silver and illustrator Heather Busch.

See also
Why Paint Cats

References 

Comedy books
Parody novels
Hoaxes in New Zealand
Ten Speed Press books
New Zealand books
1994 non-fiction books